Tereza Hladíková (born 14 April 1988) is a former professional tennis player from the Czech Republic.

She started playing tennis at the age of 8. Hladíková reached a career-high singles ranking on 27 April 2009, as the world No. 197, and her career-high doubles ranking on 4 May 2009, as No. 186. In her career, she won two singles and ten doubles titles on the ITF Women's Circuit.

Partnering Simona Dobrá, Hladíková won her first $75k tournament in June 2008 at the Smart Card Open Monet+, defeating Lucie Hradecká and Renata Voráčová in the final.

ITF finals

Singles (2–2)

Doubles (10–6)

External links
 
 

1988 births
Living people
Czech female tennis players
People from Valašské Meziříčí
Sportspeople from the Zlín Region